Rock 'n' Roll Revival is the eighth studio album by the Canadian rock band Loverboy. The album features nine classic Loverboy songs re-recorded for the album by the current lineup, as well as three new songs. The three new songs were recorded with Bob Rock at Bryan Adams' Warehouse Studio in Vancouver, BC.

Track listing

Loverboy
 Mike Reno - lead vocals
 Paul Dean - guitar, backing vocals
 Doug Johnson - keyboards, backing vocals
 Ken "Spider" Sinnaeve - bass, backing vocals
 Matt Frenette - drums

Additional personnel
 Kelly Brock - backing vocals
 Catherine St. Germain - backing vocals

References

2012 albums
Loverboy albums
Frontiers Records albums
Albums produced by Bob Rock